In mathematics and set theory, hereditarily finite sets are defined as finite sets whose elements are all hereditarily finite sets. In other words, the set itself is finite, and all of its elements are finite sets, recursively all the way down to the empty set.

Formal definition
A recursive definition of well-founded hereditarily finite sets is as follows:
 Base case: The empty set is a hereditarily finite set.
 Recursion rule: If a1,...,ak are hereditarily finite, then so is {a1,...,ak}.
and only sets that can be built by a finite number of applications of these two rules are hereditarily finite.

The set  is an example for such a hereditarily finite set and so is the empty set . 
For example, the first cannot be hereditarily finite since it contains at least one infinite set as an element, when .

Discussion

The class  is countable.

Ackermann coding

In 1937, Wilhelm Ackermann introduced an encoding of hereditarily finite sets as natural numbers.
It is defined by a function  that maps each hereditarily finite set to a natural number, given by the following recursive definition:

For example, the empty set  contains no members, and is therefore mapped to an empty sum, that is, the number zero.

where BIT denotes the BIT predicate.

The Ackermann coding can be used to construct a model of finitary set theory in the natural numbers. More precisely,  (where  is the converse relation of BIT) models Zermelo–Fraenkel set theory without the axiom of infinity.

Representation
This class of sets is naturally ranked by the number of bracket pairs necessary to represent the sets:

  (i.e. , the Neumann ordinal "0")
 
  and then also  (i.e. , the Neumann ordinal "2"),
 ... sets represented with  bracket pairs, e.g. . There are six such sets
 ... sets represented with  bracket pairs, e.g. . There are twelve such sets
, the Neumann ordinal "3")
 ... etc.
In this way, the number of sets with  bracket pairs is

Axiomatizations

Theories of finite sets
The set  also represents the first von Neumann ordinal number, denoted .

Indeed,  has a constructive axiomatizations involving these axiom and e.g. Set induction and Replacement.

Their models then also fulfill the axioms consisting of the axioms of Zermelo–Fraenkel set theory without the axiom of infinity. 
In this context, the negation of the axiom of infinity may be added, thus proving that the axiom of infinity is not a consequence of the other axioms of set theory.

ZF

The hereditarily finite sets are a subclass of the Von Neumann universe. Here, the class of all well-founded hereditarily finite sets is denoted Vω. Note that this is also a set in this context.

If we denote by ℘(S) the power set of S, and by V0 the empty set, then Vω can be obtained by setting 
V1 = ℘(V0), V2 = ℘(V1),..., Vk = ℘(Vk−1),... and so on. 

We see, again, that there are only countably many hereditarily finite sets: Vn is finite for any finite n, its cardinality is n−12 (see tetration), 
and the union of countably many finite sets is countable.

Equivalently, a set is hereditarily finite if and only if its transitive closure is finite.

Graph models
The class  can be seen to be in exact correspondence with a class of rooted trees, namely those without non-trivial symmetries (i.e. the only automorphism is the identity): 
The root vertex corresponds to the top level bracket  and each edge leads to an element (another such set) that can act as a root vertex in its own right. No automorphism of this graph exist, corresponding to the fact that equal branches are identified (e.g. , trivializing the permutation of the two subgraphs of shape ).
This graph model enables an implementation of ZF without infinity as data types and thus an interpretation of set theory in expressive type theories.

Graph models exist for ZF and also set theories different from Zermelo set theory, such as non-well founded theories. Such models have more intricate edge structure.

In graph theory, the graph whose vertices correspond to hereditarily finite sets and edges correspond to set membership is the Rado graph or random graph.

See also
Hereditary set
Hereditarily countable set
Hereditary property
Rooted trees
Constructive set theory
Finite set

References

Set theory